The National Railroad Construction and Maintenance Association, Inc. (NRC) is a trade association in the railroad and rail transit construction industry. The NRC is a non-profit trade association, governed by a board of directors and administered by the Washington, D.C., government relations firm, TGA AMS. NRC members include rail construction and maintenance contractors such as Balfour Beatty Rail, Inc.,Colo Railroad Builders, Delta Railroad Construction, Inc., Herzog Contracting Corp., Kiewit Western Co., Loram Maintenance of Way, Inc., RailWorks Corporation, and Stacy and Witbeck, Inc.; in addition to supplier companies such as A&K Railroad Materials, Inc., Harsco Rail, L. B. Foster Company, Progress Rail Services, Inc., and Western-Cullen-Hayes, Inc.

The NRC holds an annual conference and exhibition each January, taking place alternating between the East and West Coasts and regularly encompassing more than 1,000 attendees with around 100 exhibitors. Attendees include executives from rail construction contractors, suppliers, and associated professional service firms. Speakers are generally engineering executives from freight railroads, executives and administrators of public rail transit agencies, and a small number of related experts on topics, such as railroad financial analysis and rail-related federal legislative developments. The first NRC Conference took place in 1973 and has been held annually without interruption ever since.

The NRC hosts an annual railroad construction and maintenance equipment auction each spring. In the auction, NRC member companies buy and sell rail construction and maintenance equipment from each other and from railroads that participate. The auctions have ranged in size from 150 to 300 pieces of equipment, with a total value of $400,000 to $750,000. The first NRC-organized auction took place in March 2004, and have been held annually without interruption ever since.

The NRC participates in organizing an annual "Railroad Day on Capitol Hill" event, in cooperation with the lead organizations, the American Short Line and Regional Railroad Association (ASLRRA) and the Association of American Railroads (AAR).

See also 
American Public Transportation Association (APTA)
American Railway Engineering and Maintenance-of-Way Association (AREMA)
American Short Line and Regional Railroad Association (ASLRRA)
Association of American Railroads (AAR)
Associated General Contractors of America (AGC)
American Road and Transportation Builders Association (ARTBA)

References 

NRC - Official site
May 14, 2012 interview in rail industry trade journal Railway Track & Structures with NRC Chairman of the Board Terry Benton and President Chuck Baker
April 29, 2011 interview in rail industry trade journal Railway Track & Structures with NRC Chairman of the Board Jim Perkins and President Chuck Baker
April 2011 story in rail industry trade journal Progressive Railroading entitled "Maintenance of Way: NRC and Contractor Safety
March 10, 2011 story in rail industry trade journal Railway Track & Structures about the NRC's January 2011 Conference in Florida

External links

Non-profit organizations based in Washington, D.C.
Public transportation in the United States
Railway associations
Construction organizations